In the Middle Ages, a squire was the shield- or armour-bearer of a knight.

Use of the term evolved over time. Initially, a squire served as a knight's apprentice. Later, a village leader or a lord of the manor might come to be known as a "squire", and still later, the term was applied to members of the landed gentry. In contemporary American usage, "squire" is the title given to justices of the peace or similar local dignitaries.

Squire is a shortened version of the word esquire,  from the Old French  (modern French ), itself derived from the Late Latin  ("shield bearer"), in medieval or Old English  a scutifer.

Knights in training
The most common definition of squire refers to the Middle Ages. A squire was typically a young boy, training to become a knight. A boy became a page at the age of 7 then a squire at age 14. Squires were the second step to becoming a knight, after having served as a page. Boys served a knight as an attendant, doing simple but important tasks such as saddling a horse or caring for the knight's weapons and armour. The squire would sometimes carry the knight's flag into battle with his master.

Jobs 
The typical jobs of a squire included:
 Carrying the knight's armour, shield and sword
 Maintaining the knight's equipment
 Scrubbing armour
 Taking care of the horse(s)
 Replacing an injured or killed horse
 Guarding prisoners
 Accompanying the knight to tournaments and the battlefield
 Dressing the knight in armour
 Carrying the knight's flag
 Protecting the knight
 Ensuring an honourable burial of the knight if killed

In literature 
The young King Arthur served as Sir Kay's squire in the traditional tale of the Sword in the Stone that appears in literary works, including Le Morte d'Arthur and The Once and Future King. One of the pilgrim-storytellers in The Canterbury Tales is a squire who is the son of the knight that he serves. In Miguel de Cervantes' Don Quixote, the babbling Sancho Panza serves as squire of the deluded Don. In the children's book The Castle in the Attic by Elizabeth Winthrop, the protagonist William serves as the squire of Sir Simon, a knight from the Middle Ages who got transported to the present.

Landed gentry 
In the English countryside from the Middle Ages until the early 20th century, there was often one principal family of landed gentry, owning much of the land and living in the largest house, often referred to by people lower down the social scale as the "big house". The head of this family was often the lord of the manor and called "the squire". Lords of the manor held the rank of esquire by prescription.

Squires were gentlemen, usually with a coat of arms, and were often related to peers.  The squire usually lived at the village manor house and owned an estate, comprising the village, with the villagers being his tenants. If the squire owned the advowson or living (i.e. "was patron") of the parish church — and he often did — he would choose the incumbent, designated as either a rector, or if the parish had a lay rector or impropriator, who was often the squire himself, a vicar. These roles were often filled by a younger son of the squire or of another family of local gentry. Some squires also became parish incumbents themselves and were known as squarsons; a portmanteau of the words squire and parson. The squire would also have performed a number of important local duties, in particular that of Justice of the Peace or Member of Parliament.

Such was the power of the squires at this time that modern historians have created the term 'squirearchy'. Politically, during the 19th century, squires tended to be Tories, whereas the greatest landlords tended to be Whigs.

The position of squire was traditionally associated with occupation of the manor house, which would often itself confer the dignity of squire. It is unclear how widely the village squire may still be said to survive today, but where it does, the role is likely more dependent upon a recognition of lineage and long family association rather than land, which, while relevant, is nowadays likely to be considerably smaller than in former years due to high post-war death duties and the prohibitive costs associated with maintaining large country houses.

In Scotland, whilst esquire and gentleman are technically correctly used at the Court of the Lord Lyon, the title laird, in place of squire, is more common. Moreover, in Scotland, lairds append their territorial designation to their names as was traditionally done on the mainland of Europe (e.g., Donald Cameron of Lochiel). The territorial designation fell into disuse in England early on, save for peers of the realm.

In literature 
The later form of squire as a gentleman appears in much of English literature, for example in the form of Squire Trelawney in Robert Louis Stevenson's Treasure Island. William Makepeace Thackeray depicted a squire in Vanity Fair as a lecherous, ill-educated, badly mannered relic of an earlier age. However, he clearly shows their control of the life of the parish. Others include Squire Hamley in Elizabeth Gaskell's Wives and Daughters and Squire Allworthy (based on Ralph Allen) in the novel Tom Jones by Henry Fielding, who was himself a squire and magistrate. There is also a notable squire in Cormac McCarthy's Outer Dark and Charles Reade's 1856 novel It is Never Too Late to Mend, where the squire uses his authority to abuse the postal and judicial services. In the Aubrey-Maturin series of novels by Patrick O'Brian, Jack Aubrey's father, General Aubrey and later Jack himself, are typical squires.

Mary Ann Evans, alias George Eliot, includes Squire Cass as a character in her novel Silas Marner. One of the main characters of Anthony Trollope's Doctor Thorne, published in 1858, is Squire Francis Newbold Gresham. Sherlock Holmes' ancestors are mentioned to be country squires in Sir Arthur Conan Doyle's stories.

National variations

England 
The "Royal Esquires" of the late-medieval English Court were not young men studying for knighthood. Far more frequently, and certainly from Edward III to Henry VIII, they tended to be men of a similar age to the monarch; having his complete trust.

In the 15th-century Black Book of the Household – a set of ordinances composed for Edward IV for the "Governance and Regulation of the Royal Household" – the king had only four "Esquires for the Bodie"; these were the most senior servants in the royal household, with total access to the royal person at all hours. They were the senior staff of the privy chamber, and the closest of the king's "Affinity" (i.e., his most intimate daily companions), and were the only servants in the household who were required – not just allowed – to bear arms in the king's presence, as one of their duties was to act as bodyguards "of last resort" in the event of an immediate threat to the royal person.

In times of war when their royal master was "under arms" himself, they would also fight at his side. They oversaw his pages and the other lesser servants of the privy chamber and acted as his valet, and stood guard while he was shaved, washed or bathed. One stood behind his chair when he dined. Squires accompanied him at play, including wagering with him on the results of games (see wagers lost and won recorded in the account books of Henry VII, each page signed by the king, National Archives at Kew) and delivered confidential messages of all kinds.

Edward IV and Richard III only appointed four esquires each. Henry VII appointed four of his closest "companions of Our late Exile" within days of his victory at the Battle of Bosworth Field on 22 August 1485, and an extra five esquires by the end of his reign in 1509. His son Henry VIII retained his father's esquires of the body while dismissing others of his father's senior officers and even executing some (for example, Richard Empson and Edmund Dudley), but he vastly increased the number of that select group, as he enlarged the rest of the royal household as set down in the Statutes of Eltham. The position was highly regarded, for the value of its close access to the king. At least two notable late-medieval gentlemen are recorded contemporaneously as refusing knighthood, declaring that to be an "Esquire of the Body" was a far-greater honour.

In the post-medieval world, the title of esquire came to belong to all men of the higher landed gentry; an esquire ranked socially above a gentleman but below a knight. In the modern world, the term has correspondingly often been extended (albeit only in very formal writing) to all men without any higher title. It is used post-nominally, usually in abbreviated form: "John Smith, Esq.", for example.

As an informal term 
 The term squire is sometimes used, particularly in London and its environs, by men when addressing another man. Although historically used to a man perceived as being of higher social class (similar to guvnor), its modern usage is often ironic with friendly humorous intent due to it being something of an anachronism. The original usage in conversations between people of different social classes crops up frequently in comedy sketches by Monty Python, such as: "What can I do for you, squire?".

 The German term for squire, Knappe, sometimes also is a name for journeyman and similar occupations (originally probably as "esquires" to the master as their "knight"). Among others this gave rise to the alternative term Bergknappe ("mountain squire") for a miner; Die Knappen (plural form) is a nickname for the team of the soccer club FC Schalke 04, referring to the local Miners.

United States 
In the United States, this style is most common among lawyers, borrowing from the English tradition whereby all barristers were styled "esquires". (Solicitors were entitled only to the style "Mr".) In earlier years in the U.S., the title squire was given to a justice of the peace, for example Squire Jones.  It was also used to mean justice of the peace as in the example, "He was taken before the squire."  The connection to attorneys appears to have evolved from a time when squires meeting to negotiate a duel would instead resolve the dispute.

References

Titles
Gentry
Gendered occupations
Knights